Mimicoclytrina is a genus of beetles in the family Buprestidae. It contains the following species:

 Mimicoclytrina childreni (Laporte & Gory, 1835)
 Mimicoclytrina parrii (Saunders, 1869)
 Mimicoclytrina piliventris (Saunders, 1869)
 Mimicoclytrina saundersii (Waterhouse, 1904)
 Mimicoclytrina tristis (Thomson, 1878)

References

Buprestidae genera